The Borel Bo.11 was a French two-seat general purpose monoplane designed and built by Etablissements Borel.

Design and development
The Bo.11 was mid-wing monoplane from 1911 with wire-braced wings and lateral control by wing warping. It was powered by a  Gnome rotary piston engine. The Bo.11 served with the Aéronautique Militaire at military air training schools and at a civil flying school at Buc. The aircraft could be fitted with twin floats.

Specifications

See also

References

Notes

Bibliography

1910s French military utility aircraft
Floatplanes
Bo11
Single-engined tractor aircraft
Rotary-engined aircraft
Aircraft first flown in 1911